Southmead is a northern suburb and council ward of Bristol, in the south west of England, bordered by Filton in South Gloucestershire and Monks Park, Horfield, Henleaze and Westbury on Trym.

The River Trym rises in Southmead and flows south west through Badock's Wood, a Local Nature Reserve. There is a round barrow near the northern end of the wood, and a Site of Special Scientific Interest, Pen Park Hole.

History
Southmead was a manor of the parish of Westbury on Trym. The manor house, mentioned in a document of 1319, was near the south end of what is now Southmead Road. By 1888 Southmead was a small hamlet on Southmead Road. Southmead Hospital, formerly the Barton Regis Workhouse, was opened there in 1924.

Large-scale development of the area started in 1931, when the Bristol Corporation built 1,500 houses to the north of Southmead Road, partly to house families cleared from the slums of central Bristol, and partly to address the housing shortage at the time. A further 1,100 houses were built after the Second World War. Since the Second World War, a reference has often been made by the local community, to the 'pre-war estate' of Southmead and the 'post-war estate', with locals also referring to them as "the old estate" and "the new estate".

Southmead today

The centre of Southmead is along Greystoke Avenue, a wide road with grassy areas some distance to the north of the original hamlet on Southmead Road. The area to the south and west falls within Westbury-on-Trym and Henleaze ward since the last boundary review and further to the May 2016 elections. Parts of Southmead to the south east of Southmead Road, including the hospital, are in Horfield ward.

Social issues
Efforts have been made to improve the area's social problems and implement environmental improvements, many of which have been successful. Social policies have led to a more mixed housing offer and to some gentrification, with improved infrastructure and local services. The right to buy has led to an increased transfer of housing provision from tenanted to owner-occupation. Major employment hubs at Filton, MOD Abbey Wood and the increase of services at Southmead Hospital have brought increased affluence and opportunity to the area. A greater selection of shops and facilities have come to the area, allowing those on limited incomes to access food more cheaply and readily. Whilst Southmead as an area looks and feels as though it is improving, it still experiences some deprivation. The central part of Southmead still sits within the most 10% deprived areas of England, and the south west of the ward since 2015 now falls within the bottom 10-20% most deprived areas. Ongoing social policies and economic impacts are taking time to incrementally improve the area.

Residents have good geographical access to services. Despite there having been some transfer of public services away from physical resources to more central, virtual and internet based services; there is still a small police facility at the hospital and a fire station on Southmead Road. Bus services, whilst sometimes locally critiqued, are accessible and more frequent as compared to some other areas of the City. A frequent service connects residents to the Gloucester Road area, City Centre and Cribbs Causeway for shopping.

There is provision of health services with a doctor's surgery on Ullswater Road and at the art-deco style Greenway Centre. A regional hospital, and A&E facility can be found at Southmead Hospital. The Lannercost provides facilities for those with physical and learning impairments. There are a selection of care homes and sheltered accommodation about the ward area. Despite access to health facilities Southmead still has poor health outcomes, with life expectancy at 77 years, five years lower than neighbouring Henleaze and above some areas such as the Bedminster at 76.4 years.

The area is well served with a range of local parks and sporting facilities. There is a private members' sports club at David Lloyd near Badock's Wood. There are sports pitches and a gym at Greenway Centre to the south east, and pitches at Charlton Mead to the east. Filton Golf Course abuts Southmead to the north east. There is an MUGA and Adventure Playground off Doncaster Road. There are also play areas off of Glencoyne Square, Charlton Mead and Greystoke Avenue. A mile to the south of Southmead is Horfield Sports Centre with public access to 3G pitches, gym, sports Hall and a swimming pool. Blaise Castle, Coombe Dingle and Kingsweston House offer good green open space only a few miles away.

There is ready access to children's provision through a selection of primary schools at Baddocks Wood, Little Mead and Fonthill. Baddocks Wood Children Centre complements Early Year's provision to the south of the area.

Social cohesion
Southmead has historically had adverse press due to community safety. As with any area there have been mixed experiences by residents and visitors. The area is said by locals to be "a great place [with] ... a strong sense of community spirit, lots of community activity and lots of optimism for the future." The local neighbourhood plan says "our vision is that Southmead is known as a great place for everyone to live, a strong community where residents work together, inspire each other and people of all ages have the skills and confidence to achieve their full potential". This plan was the outcome of significant community consultation and planning. Two of the nine strands of the community plan target community safety and strengthening the community (including inclusion and cohesion). The Southmead Development Trust (SDT) co-ordinates and oversees the plan.

References

 
Areas of Bristol
Wards of Bristol